Sharon Core (born 1965) is an American artist and photographer. Core first gained recognition with her Thiebauds series (2003-4) in which she created photographic interpretations of American painter Wayne Thiebaud's renderings of food. Two of her works in the Thiebauds series, Candy Counter 1969 (2004) and Confections (2005) were acquired by the Solomon R. Guggenheim Museum in 2005.

Early life and education
Core was born in New Orleans in 1965. She received a Bachelor of Fine Arts in 1987 from the University of Georgia and a Master of Fine Arts from the Yale University School of Art in 1998, which is where she received the George Sakier Memorial Prize for Excellence in Photography.

Career
After studying painting at the University of Georgia, Core moved to Stockholm, Sweden. She then settled in Prague in 1993, where she first practiced photography seriously and created a baking business based in her own apartment. In 1996, she returned to the United States to attend the Yale University School of Art. For her thesis project, which was centered around the ritual of eating, she photographed people consuming their favorite foods.

This project led to her early series, Drunk (1998–2000), in which she captured portraits of intoxicated guests at a party she organized as well as those she found at local gatherings.

Her next series, Early American (2007–2010), remodeled the still lifes of 18th century American painter Raphaelle Peale. Similar to the photographs of Thiebauds, Core again focused on the idea of process, growing the early 19th century produce in Peale's paintings in her greenhouse and collecting period dish ware. She also painted the walls in the backdrop of the photographs to echo Peale's painting techniques. These works were on view at the Yancey Richardson Gallery in New York City from October 23 to December 6, 2008.

Core's project 1606-1907 (2011–2015) explored three centuries of flower paintings.

For her subsequent project "Understory" (2015), Core takes inspiration from the seventeenth-century Sottobosco tradition of Dutch paintings of forest floors. According to a description in The New Yorker, "Core's new pictures revel in decay and wildness. Snails slither across bright, wet leaves; pink flowers collapse in a pile of petals; a toad peers from the shadows, camouflaged in the dirt."

Copyright controversy 
In her series Thiebauds (2003–2005), Core recreated 18 of Wayne Thiebaud's food paintings of the 1960s. She was inspired upon viewing Thiebaud's retrospective at the Whitney Museum of American Art in 2001. According to Robert Panzer, the executive director of the Visual Artists and Galleries Association (the copyright collective that represents Thiebaud), "Wayne Thiebaud is concerned with the use that Sharon Core has made of his work...The reproductions she has made are largely straightforward versions of his paintings."

Personal life 
Core lives and works in Esopus, New York.

Exhibitions 
Core has presented solo exhibitions at spaces across the U.S.:
 White Room Exhibition, White Columns, New York (2000)
 Sharon Core: Photographs, Clementine Gallery, New York (2001)
 Thiebauds, Bellwether Gallery, New York (2004)
 Early American, Yancey Richardson Gallery, New York (2008),
 James Kelly Contemporary, Santa Fe, New Mexico (2009),
 Hermes Foundation, New York (2009),
 Savannah College of Art and Design, Savannah, Georgia (2009)
 Project Gallery, Yancey Richardson Gallery, New York (2010)
 1606-1907, Yancey Richardson Gallery, New York (2011) 
 Still Lives: Early Works by Sharon Core, Mint Museum, Charlotte, North Carolina (2013)
 Understory, Yancey Richardson Gallery, New York (2016)

Selected collections 
Core's works have also been purchased by various institutions:
 Alturas Foundation, San Antonio, Texas
 Amon Carter Museum, Fort Worth, Texas
 Cleveland Museum of Art, Cleveland, Ohio 
 Columbus Museum, Columbus, Georgia
 Cornell Museum, Cleveland, Ohio
 Hermes Foundation, Paris, France
 J. Paul Getty Museum, Los Angeles, California 
 Lannan Foundation, Santa Fe, New Mexico
 Montclair Art Museum, Montclair, New Jersey
 National Gallery of Art, Washington, DC
 Norton Museum of Art, West Palm Beach, Florida
 The Phillips Collection, Washington, DC
 Princeton University Art Museum, Princeton, New Jersey
 Samuel Dorsky Museum of Art, State University of New York, New Paltz, New York
 Solomon R. Guggenheim Museum, New York, New York 
 The Mint Museum, Charlotte, North Carolina
 The National Museum of Women in the Arts, Washington, D.C.
 The Norton Collection, New York, New York
 The West Collection, SEI, Oaks Park, Pennsylvania
 The Zabludowicz Collection, London England, Sarvisalo, Finland, New York, New York
 University of Virginia Art Museum, Charlottesville, VA
 Yale University Art Gallery, New Haven, CT

Further reading 
 Haight, Emily. "5 Fast Facts: Sharon Core." Web blog post. Broad Strokes. The National Museum of Women in the Arts, 26 August 2015. Web. Accessed 2 August 2016. http://broadstrokes.org/2015/08/26/5-fast-facts-sharon-core/.
 Sholis, Brian. "Cross pollination," foreword essay to Early American, by Sharon Core. Santa Fe, New Mexico: Radius Books, 2012. 
 Sholis, Brian. "Sharon Core," in "Vitamin PH: New Perspectives in Photography." London, New York: Phaidon Press, 2006.
 Stephan, Annelisa. "A Seductive Still Life." Web blog post. The Iris: Behind the Scenes at the Getty. The J. Paul Getty Museum, 17 September 2010. Web. Accessed 2 August 2016. http://blogs.getty.edu/iris/a-seductive-still-life/.
 Stonecipher, Donna. "A Poetics of Appropriation: On Sharon Core." Online art journal. Hyperallergic. 17 October 2015. Web. Accessed 5 January 2017. http://hyperallergic.com/245428/a-poetics-of-appropriation-on-sharon-core/.

References

External links
 

American women photographers
American contemporary artists
1965 births
Living people
20th-century American photographers
20th-century American women artists
21st-century American photographers
21st-century American women artists
Artists from New Orleans
Photographers from Louisiana
University of Georgia alumni
Yale School of Art alumni
People from Esopus, New York